= Chamoo =

Village in Uttar Pradesh, India

Chamoo is a village in Prayagraj, Uttar Pradesh, India.
